Acceleration 2014 was a multi-day festival combining top class car and bike racing with live music and other entertainment. The festival was organised by the International Sport Racing Association (ISRA), based in the Netherlands, and was held six times in 2014, starting 25–27 April in Portimao, Portugal and ending 17–19 October in Assen, Netherlands. The various racing competitions were 
Formula Acceleration 1 (FA1), 
the MW-V6 Pickup Series, 
the Legend SuperCup (LSC), 
the European Stock 1000 Series (ACC 1000)
and the European Stock 600 Series (ACC 600). 
Competing drivers in one or more classes each drove a vehicle representing his or her country of origin.

Calendar

The 2014 calendar consisted of six race weekends. Originally, ten were planned. However, Acceleration in Zolder, Acceleration at Paul Ricard, and Acceleration at Grobnik were cancelled on 27 June 2014 and Acceleration at Hungaroring was cancelled on 21 August 2014.

Racing competitions

Formula Acceleration 1

Each FA1 team represented a nation. Their drivers may have been a different nationality, but the car represented the country. The winning driver/team was entitled to the full budget for the 2015 FA1 season and a test day in the GP2 Series car in Abu Dhabi.

Race format

Technical specifications
All cars were mechanically identical and had been built with reducing costs in mind, which led to an approximate price for the whole season of €450,000. FA1 used the Lola B05/52, which had been used in the A1 Grand Prix between 2005 and 2008.

Engine: 3.4L V8 Zytek ZA1348
Horsepower: 550 hp
Weight: 698 kg (driver included)
Gearbox: electronic, six gears
Tyres: Michelin

MW-V6 Pickup Series

Race format

The starting order of race 3 was decided by a combined result of Q1 and Q2 with the first 8 reversed. For race 1 and 2, the top 10 finishers scored points in the following order: 20, 15, 12, 10, 8, 6, 4, 3, 2, 1. For race 3, the top 10 finishers scored points in the following order: 25, 18, 15, 12, 10, 8, 6, 4, 2, 1.
The drivers' champion was entitled to a test day in the 2015 FA1 car plus either half the budget for the 2015 FA1 season or the full budget for the 2015 MW-V6 season.

Technical specifications
The cars were based on those used in the Dutch racing series BRL V6 and BRL Light.
Engine: 4.0L V6 Ford, 325 hp
Gearbox: Drenth DG 400
Minimum weight: 950 kg
Tyres: Michelin

Legend SuperCup

Each LSC team represented a nation. Their drivers may have been a different nationality, but the car, whose design was derived from legends car racing, represented the country. The winning driver/team was entitled to a test day in the 2015 MW-V6 car and half the budget for the 2015 MW-V6 season.

Race format

Lots were drawn by the drivers during the briefing to determine the starting grid for Sprint Race 1. The starting grid for Sprint Race 2 was the reversed Race 1 starting grid. The starting grid for Sprint Race 3 corresponded to the points scored in Races 1 and 2 (the driver who had scored the highest number of points started on the pole). In the case of even results when adding points of races 1 and 2, the fastest lap of races 1 and 2 was to decide between the drivers.

The top 25 finishers scored points in the following order: 50, 40, 32, 26, 22, 20, 19, 18,..., 3, 2, 1.

Technical specifications
The cars were based on those used in legends car racing.
Engine: Fuel-injected YAMAHA 1250 cc (with or without carburetor)
Weight empty: 520 kg
Power: 136 hp at 10,000 rpm
Acceleration: 0–100 km/h in 3.7 sec
Top speed: 200 km/h
Tyres: Michelin/Falken Tires

European Stock 600 and 1000 Series

Each ACC 600 and ACC 1000 team represented a nation. Their drivers may have been a different nationality, but the motorcycle represented the country.

The top 15 finishers scored points in the following order: 25, 20, 16, 13, 11, 10, 9, 8, 7, 6, 5, 4, 3, 2, 1.

Technical specifications
European Stock 1000 Series:
Engine:4-cylinder (600-1000 cc) 4-stroke3-cylinder (750-1000 cc) 4-stroke2-cylinder (850-1200 cc) 4-stroke
Minimum weight: 165 kg

European Stock 600 Series:
Engine:4-cylinder (401-600 cc) 4-stroke3-cylinder (401-675 cc) 4-stroke2-cylinder (401-750 cc) 4-stroke
Minimum weight: 165 kg

References

External links
 

 
Pickup truck racing series
Stock car racing series
Music festivals in Europe
Acceleration
Music festivals in Portugal
Music festivals in the Netherlands
2014 music festivals